Simli  is a village development committee in Western Rukum District in Karnali Province of western Nepal. At the time of the 2011 Nepal census it had a population of 5316 people living in 1044 individual households.

References

Populated places in Western Rukum District